The term "Finnish war" can refer to any of the following:
 Early Finnish wars (4th-9th centuries)
 Finnish–Novgorodian wars (11th-13th centuries)
 Finnish War (1808-1809)
 Russo-Finnish wars
 Finnish Civil War (1918)
 Heimosodat (1918-1922)
 Winter War (1939–1940)
 Continuation War (1941-1944)

See also:

 Finnish war children
 Finnish war reparations to the Soviet Union